Brian O'Donnell (born 5 June 1960) is an Irish retired association footballer, rugby union player and Gaelic footballer. His league and championship career with the Galway senior team lasted eleven seasons from 1979 until 1989.

Born in Galway, O'Donnell was a sports all-rounder in his younger years. As an association football with Mervue United, he earned a place on the Irish Youths football team in 1978. O'Donnell also lined out for the Galwegians rugby team and was capped 12 times by Connacht. 

O'Donnell made his debut on the inter-county scene at the age of seventeen when he was selected for the Galway minor team. He enjoyed one championship season with the minor team, however, he was a Connacht runner-up. O'Donnell subsequently joined the Galway under-21 team, winning Connacht medals in 1979 and 1981. By this stage he had also joined the Galway senior team, making his debut during the 1979 championship. Over the course of the following decade, O'Donnell won five Connacht medals and one National Football League medal. He was an All-Ireland runner-up in 1983. O'Donnell played his last game for Galway in July 1989.

O'Donnell was also selected on the Conancht inter-provincial team, however, he ended his career without a Railway Cup medal.

In 1984 O'Donnell was selected on the Ireland team for the inaugural International Rules Series.

Honours
 University College Galway
 Sigerson Cup (3): 1981, 1983, 1984

 Galway
 Connacht Senior Football Championship (5): 1982, 1983, 1984, 1986, 1987
 National Football League (1): 1980-81
 Connacht Under-21 Football Championship (2): 1979, 1981

References

1960 births
Living people
Galway inter-county Gaelic footballers
Connacht inter-provincial Gaelic footballers
Mervue United A.F.C. players
Galwegians RFC players
Connacht Rugby players
Association footballers not categorized by position
Republic of Ireland association footballers